Fadi Saikali (born 18 August 1969) is a Lebanese judoka. He competed at the 1988 Summer Olympics and the 1992 Summer Olympics.

References

1969 births
Living people
Lebanese male judoka
Olympic judoka of Lebanon
Judoka at the 1988 Summer Olympics
Judoka at the 1992 Summer Olympics
Place of birth missing (living people)
20th-century Lebanese people